Marie Janice Cornish (born 1 October 1956) is an Australian former international cricketer. Cornish was born at Wellington, New South Wales and played nine Test matches and 16 One Day Internationals for the Australia national women's cricket team. Her final WODI appearance was in the final of the 1982 Women's Cricket World Cup.

References

Notes

Further reading

External links
 Marie Cornish at southernstars.org.au

Living people
1956 births
Australia women Test cricketers
Australia women One Day International cricketers
New South Wales Breakers cricketers